KCUG-LP (100.3 FM) is a low power radio station broadcasting an urban gospel format. The station is operated by Gospel Music Omaha. The station serves northern Omaha.

References

External links
 
 

Radio stations in Omaha, Nebraska
Radio stations established in 2017
Gospel radio stations in the United States
CUG-LP
2017 establishments in Nebraska
CUG-LP